Within the city-operated parks system of New York City, there are many parks that are either named after individuals who participated in World War I or contain monuments relating to the war.

Manhattan

 Abingdon Square Park has a memorial
 Central Park has the John Purroy Mitchel Memorial, 107th Infantry Memorial, and 307th Infantry Memorial Grove.
 Coleman Playground
 Donnellan Square
 Dorrance Brooks Square
 369th Infantry Regiment Memorial
 Chelsea Park Doughboy Statue
 Colonel Young Playground
 Colonel Young Triangle
 Duffy Square
 Finn Square
 Madison Square Park (Eternal Light Flagstaff)
 Maher Circle (site of Hooper Fountain)
 McKenna Square
 William McCray Playground
 Mitchel Square

The Bronx
 Bronx Victory Memorial at Pelham Bay Park
 Brust Park
 D’Auria-Murphy Triangle
 Devanney Triangle
 Graham Triangle
 Hawkins Park
 O’Brien Oval
 O’Neill Triangle
 Owen Dolen Park (memorial)
 Memorial Grove at Van Cortlandt Park
 Woodrow Wilson Triangle 
 Sergeant Johnson Triangle 
 Vincent Ciccarone Playground 
 Wade Triangle 
 Woodlawn Heights War Memorial 
 Zimmerman Playground

Queens
 Astoria Park Memorial
 Barclay Triangle
 Catholic War Veterans Triangle
 Daniel O’Connell Playground
 Doughboy Park
 Dwyer Square
 Fagan Square
 Flushing Fields
 Foch Sitting Area
 Foothill Malls (Hollis World War Memorial)
 Forest Park (Richmond Hill War Memorial)
 Garlinge Triangle
 Gordon Triangle
 Glendale Veterans Triangle
 Hillcrest Veterans Square
 Howard Von Dohlen Playground
 Kennedy Playground
 Legion Triangle
 Lost Battalion Hall
 Luke J. Lang Square
 Major Mark Park
 MacDonald Park (New York City)|MacDonald Park
 Mall Eighteen
 McConnell Park
 McKenna Triangle
 McKee Triangle
 Norelli-Hargreaves Playground
 Norelli-Hargreaves Triangle
 O'Connell Playground
 Proctor-Hopson Circle
 Queens Village Veterans Plaza
 Ridgewood Veterans Triangle
 Sergeant Colyer Square
 Sohncke Square
 Steinmann Triangle
 Triangle 54 (memorial flagpole)
 Veterans Park (New York City)|Veterans Park (Broad Channel)
 Veterans Square
 Wellbrook Triangle
 Winfield War Memorial
 William F. Moore Park

Brooklyn
 Alben Triangle
 Ascenzi Square
 Beattie Square
 Callahan–Kelly Playground
 Freedom Triangle
 Heisser Triangle
 Highland Park (Dawn of Glory sculpture)
 Ketchum Triangle
 Person Square
 Private Sonsire Triangle
 Saratoga Park War Memorial
 T. Raymond Nulty Square inside McCarren Park
William E. Sheridan Playground
Zion Triangle

Staten Island
 Egbert Triangle
 Levy Playground
 Hero Park
 Mahoney Playground
 DeMatti Playground
 Pleasant Plains Memorial
 White Playground

References

Squares in New York City
World War I memorials in the United States
Monuments and memorials in New York City
Military history of New York City
New York City parks-related lists